Nuša Vujinović (born 20 July 1983 in Maribor, Slovenia) is a Slovenian taekwondo athlete. She qualified for the 2012 Summer Olympics in the +67 kg category.

References

Living people
1983 births
Slovenian female taekwondo practitioners
Taekwondo practitioners at the 2012 Summer Olympics
Olympic taekwondo practitioners of Slovenia
Sportspeople from Maribor
Taekwondo practitioners at the 2015 European Games
European Games competitors for Slovenia
European Taekwondo Championships medalists